Adolf Wróbel (born 19 October 1932) is a Polish former ice hockey player. He played for Górnik Katowice, Legia Warsaw, and GKS Katowice during his career. He also played for the Polish national team at the 1956 Winter Olympics and the 1955 World Championship. Two of his brothers, Alfred and Antoni, also played for Poland at the Olympics; Alfred in both 1952 and 1956, and Antoni in 1952.

References

External links

1932 births
Living people
GKS Katowice (ice hockey) players
Ice hockey players at the 1956 Winter Olympics
Legia Warsaw (ice hockey) players
Olympic ice hockey players of Poland
Polish ice hockey forwards
Sportspeople from Katowice